Poisson may refer to:

People
Siméon Denis Poisson, French mathematician
Eric Poisson, Canadian physicist

Places
Poissons, a commune of Haute-Marne, France
Poisson, Saône-et-Loire, a commune of Saône-et-Loire, France

Other uses
Poisson (surname), a French surname
Poisson (crater), a lunar crater named after Siméon Denis Poisson
The French word for fish

See also 
Adolphe-Poisson Bay, a body of water located to the southwest of Gouin Reservoir, in La Tuque, Mauricie, Quebec
Poisson distribution, a discrete probability distribution named after Siméon Denis Poisson
Poisson's equation, a partial differential equation named after Siméon Denis Poisson
List of things named after Siméon Denis Poisson
Poison (disambiguation)